Copa Airlines Colombia provides service to 1 city in Colombia and 2 international destinations.

List

External links 
Copa Airlines Colombia route map

References 

Lists of airline destinations
Copa Airlines